is a train station in the town of Kawanehon, Haibara District, Shizuoka Prefecture, Japan, operated by the Ōigawa Railway.

Lines

Station layout
The station has one side platform serving a single track, and a small rain shelter for passengers. The station is unattended.

Adjacent stations

|-
!colspan=5|Ōigawa Railway

Station history
Sawama Station was opened on August 1, 1959.

Passenger statistics
In fiscal 2017, the station was used by an average of 0.4 passengers daily (boarding passengers only).

Surrounding area
Oi River

See also
 List of Railway Stations in Japan

References

External links

 Ōigawa Railway home page

Stations of Ōigawa Railway
Railway stations in Shizuoka Prefecture
Railway stations in Japan opened in 1959
Kawanehon, Shizuoka